The Harmony Historic District encompasses the first early 19th century settlement of the Harmony Society, in what is now Harmony, Butler County, Pennsylvania, USA.  It covers an area two blocks wide, extending north from German Road to Conoquenessing Creek between Liberty and Wood Streets.  The area retains a number of buildings dating to the original settlement period, and was designated a National Historic Landmark District in 1974.

Description and history
The Harmony Society was founded in what is now Germany in 1785 by Johann Georg Rapp.  Meeting with opposition from the dominant Lutheran Church, Rapp and his followers emigrated to North America, and purchased the land in Butler County where the community of 200 families founded Harmony in 1805.  The utopian community was run as a communist theocracy, with Rapp and later his son as its leading figure.  The Harmonist community was successful, growing to about 700 by 1814, when Rapp's son Frederick established a new settlement in the Indiana Territory, now New Harmony, Indiana.  They eventually moved back to Pennsylvania, settling Economy in 1825, and died out as an organization in 1905.

The surviving elements of the early Harmonist settlement include a grid of streets in the heart of the modern town of Harmony, and a number of primarily brick buildings in that area.  The district includes ten contributing buildings and one contributing site.  Principal among these are the Great House or Bentle Building (c. 1811), Langenbacher House (c. 1805), Harmonist Church (1808), The "Stohr," Beam Hotel, Frederick Rapp House, Schmitt House, Schreiber House, Wagner House, and Mueller House.  The original Harmonist Cemetery contains the unmarked graves of 100 early Harmonists.

See also
List of National Historic Landmarks in Pennsylvania
National Register of Historic Places listings in Butler County, Pennsylvania

References

External links 

Harmony Museum, in the Great House

National Historic Landmarks in Pennsylvania
Historic districts on the National Register of Historic Places in Pennsylvania
Geography of Butler County, Pennsylvania
Museums in Butler County, Pennsylvania
History museums in Pennsylvania
Religious museums in Pennsylvania
1804 establishments in Pennsylvania
National Register of Historic Places in Butler County, Pennsylvania